The 2008–09 edition of the Libyan Second Division began on Tuesday, November 4, 2008. 45 clubs (shown below in their respective groups) will attempt to win promotion to the Libyan Premier League for the 2009–10 season.

System
The clubs are sorted by their geographical location in Libya. Groups A & B contain 23 teams that hail from Tripoli, Misrata, Zawiya and Sabha. Groups C & D contain 22 teams that hail from Benghazi, Sirte, Jabal al Akhdar and Al Butnan.

The top two in each group progress to the Final Qualification stage, making 8 teams. These eight teams will be placed in one group, and will play each other, home and away, to determine the two clubs that win promotion to the Libyan Premier League for the 2009-10 season. The club that finishes top of the Final Qualification group claims the Libyan Second Division title for the 2008-09 season. Any bookings, sendings-off or other punishments will be carried forward to the Final Qualification stage.

The two clubs that finish bottom of their respective groups are directly relegated to the Libyan Third Division for the 2009-10 season.

If two or more teams are tied for a particular position, the tie-breaker is as follows:
I) Head-to-Head record between the team(s) in question:
i) Total number of goals scored in meetings between team(s) in question
ii) Total number of away goals scored in meetings between team(s) in question
II) Goal difference
III) Total number of goals scored
IV) Play-off match at neutral venue.

Promotion and Relegation

Promoted from 2007–08 Libyan Third Division

Libya Railway
Wefaq Ajdabiya
Al Dhahra B.
Al Ittihad G.
Al Mahdeeya
Al Anwaar
Shamaal Benghazi
Al Hilal Tobruk
Al Qairawaan
Nusoor al Khaleej

Relegated to 2008–09 Libyan Third Division

Al Tahaddy Misratah
Al Ikhaa
Ghawt al Sha'al
Al Qurthabia
Al Manshea
Al Taraabet
Al Tayaraan
Al Buraaq
Al Shalaal
Al Mukhtar B.

Relegated from 2007–08 Libyan Premier League

Al Suqoor
Al Urouba
Nojom Ajdabiya
Al Tahaddi

Participating clubs

Group A

Group B

1(Al Shabab al Wahdawi withdrew from the competition at the mid-season break, and therefore had all matches cancelled)

Group C

Group D

League tables

Group A

Group B

Group C

Group D

Championship Stage

The top two teams in each group will qualify to this stage of the competition, making 8 teams. These 8 teams will play each other home and away, and the top two sides at the end of these 14 matches will be promoted to the Libyan Premier League for the 2009–10 season. The top team will be crowned champions for this season.

The draw for the Championship Stage will take place on May 27, 2009, at 11:00 EET

League table

References 

 
Libyan Second Division
2008–09 in Libyan football